Diketopyrrolopyrroles (DPPs) are organic dyes and pigments based on the heterocyclic dilactam 2,5-dihydropyrrolo[3,4-c]pyrrole-1,4-dione, widely used in optoelectronics. DPPs were initially used as pigments in the painting industry (e.g. in automotive paints) due to their high resistance to photodegradation. More recently, DPP derivatives have been also investigated as promising fluorescent dyes for bioimaging applications, as well as components of materials for use in organic electronics.

Structure 

DPP dyes are based on the bicyclic heterocyclic compound diketopyrrolopyrrole. 2,5-Dihydropyrrolo[3,4-c]pyrrol-1,4-dion is a basic body of Diketopyrrolopyrrole dye. DPP pigments are an important class of high-performance pigments used in inks, paints and plastic. More recently their optical-electronic performance was discovered for photovoltaic applications and related uses.

Optical properties 
DPP has high stability to heat but not very well to acid and base. The alkylation of amide groups improves the solubility. The modified DDP shows high fluorescence and the emission wavelength is adjustable by change the aromatic group at 3 and 6 positions. Both electron donor group, such as thiophene, and expanding of the conjugated system increase the emission wavelength. DPP is also developed as a red emitting group in pure polymer light emitting diodes. Some DPP derivatives show aggregation induced emission and were used as effective fluorescent sensors, in organic solar cells.

References

Further reading
 Chem. Commun., 2012, 48, 3039–3051

Lactams
Heterocyclic compounds with 2 rings
Fluorescent dyes
Organic electronics